Choate may refer to:

Places

Canada
 Choate, British Columbia, a locality in the Fraser Canyon of British Columbia, Canada
 , a lake in the Cariboo region of British Columbia, Canada

United States
 Choate Mental Health and Development Center, a psychiatric hospital in Anna, Illinois
 Choate Rosemary Hall, a prep school in Wallingford, Connecticut
 Choate House (Massachusetts), a historic house on Choate Island in the Crane Wildlife Refuge, Essex, Massachusetts
 Choate Creek, a creek in Michigan
 Choate House (Pleasantville, New York), 1867 house converted into a private sanitarium
 Choate, Texas, a town
 Choate, Wisconsin, an unincorporated community

Other uses
 Choate (law), a legal term
 Choate (surname)

See also
 Choate, Hall & Stewart, Boston law firm
 Choate House (disambiguation)